The 2016 World RX of France was the eighth round of the third season of the FIA World Rallycross Championship. The event was held at the Circuit de Lohéac in the Lohéac commune of Bretagne.

Supercar

Heats

Semi-finals
Semi-Final 1

Semi-Final 2

Final

Standings after the event

References

External links

|- style="text-align:center"
|width="35%"|Previous race:2016 World RX of Canada
|width="40%"|FIA World Rallycross Championship2016 season
|width="35%"|Next race:2016 World RX of Barcelona
|- style="text-align:center"
|width="35%"|Previous race:2015 World RX of France
|width="40%"|World RX of France
|width="35%"|Next race:2017 World RX of France
|- style="text-align:center"

France
World RX
World RX